Daniel Puce (born 25 July 1970 in Pavia) is an Italian football defender. During his career, Puce played for Lausanne, Monthey, Sion, Meppen, Wil, Shanghai Zhongyuan and Malley.

External links

1970 births
Living people
Italian footballers
FC Lausanne-Sport players
FC Sion players
SV Meppen players
FC Wil players
Expatriate footballers in China
Association football defenders